Catherine Raîche (born 1989) is the assistant general manager for the Cleveland Browns. She previously held the position of vice president of football operations for the Philadelphia Eagles of the National Football League (NFL). She has also held front office positions with the Montreal Alouettes and the Toronto Argonauts of the Canadian Football League (CFL); and in the XFL (2020) Tampa Bay front office in the XFL's second version of the league.

Early life and education
In 1989, Raîche was born in Montreal, Quebec. She completed a degree in law at the Université de Sherbrooke and a master's degree in tax.

Career
Raîche began her career in law in 2012 practicing for the Quebec Bar Association. From 2012 to 2015, she worked in business law for a Montreal firm. In 2015, Raîche changed her career and began working in sports for the Montreal Alouettes as an intern. Later in the year, she became the coordinator of Football Administration for the Alouettes in December 2015. Raîche's appointment to the Alouettes made her the first woman to become a personnel executive in the CFL since the hiring of Ottawa Rough Riders general manager Jo-Anne Polak in 1988.

Raîche was a coordinator until January 2017 when she was promoted to assistant general manager alongside Joe Mack for the Alouettes. At the time, she was the only female assistant general manager in the CFL and was the first woman to become a CFL assistant general manager. She remained with the Alouettes before resigning in December 2017. After resigning from her position with the Alouettes, Raîche became the Toronto Argonauts director of football administration in January 2018. She left the Argonauts in April 2019 for a front office position in the XFL, at Tampa Bay, reuniting her with head coach/general manager Marc Trestman who was relieved of his duties with Toronto in November 2018. 

On July 25, 2019, Raîche was hired as football operations coordinator by the Philadelphia Eagles in the NFL. She was then promoted to the position of vice president of football operations for the Eagles on May 27, 2021. With her promotion, she became the second highest ranked woman in Philadelphia Eagles and  NFL history to be involved in football personnel. Susan Tose Spencer became the first and only female GM in NFL history when she was hired as the Philadelphia Eagles general manager in 1983. In 2022, Raîche was selected by the Cleveland Browns to become the team's vice-president of football operations and assistant general manager.

References

External links
 
 NFL Philadelphia Eagles, Catherine Raîche profile
 XFL Newsroom, Catherine Raiche
 , Catherine Raîche 
 CFL, Catherine Raîche
 CFL Toronto Argonauts, Catherine Raîche
 CFL Montreal Alouettes, Catherine Raîche

Living people
1989 births
Canadian sportswomen
Sportspeople from Montreal
Canadian football people from Montreal
Montreal Alouettes personnel
Philadelphia Eagles executives
Tampa Bay Vipers personnel
Toronto Argonauts personnel
Université de Sherbrooke alumni
Cleveland Browns executives